Amy Grant is an American singer-songwriter, musician, author, media personality and actress, best known for her Christian music. She has been referred to as "The Queen of Christian Pop". As of 2009, Grant remains the best-selling contemporary Christian music singer ever, having sold over 30 million units worldwide.

Grant made her debut as a teenager, and gained fame in Christian music during the 1980s with such hits as "Father's Eyes," "El Shaddai", and "Angels". In 1986, she scored her first number one charting Billboard Hot 100 hit song in a duet with Peter Cetera "The Next Time I Fall". During the 1980s and 1990s, she became one of the first gospel artists to cross over into mainstream pop on the heels of her successful albums Unguarded and Heart in Motion, the latter of which included the number-one single "Baby Baby."

Grant has won six Grammy Awards, 22 Gospel Music Association Dove Awards, and had the first Christian album ever to go Platinum. Heart in Motion is her highest selling album, with over five million copies sold in the United States alone. She was honored with a star on Hollywood Walk of Fame in 2005 for her contributions to the entertainment industry.

Academy of Achievement
The American Academy of Achievement is a nonprofit organization that seeks to educate and inspire youth. Amy Grant has received an award in 1996.

|-
| align="center"| 1996
| align="center"| Amy Grant
| align="center"| Golden Plate Award
|
|-

American Music Awards
The American Music Awards are awarded annually for outstanding achievements in the record industry in the United States. Amy Grant has received only one nomination.

|-
| align="center"| 1993
| align="center"| Amy Grant
| align="center"|Favorite Pop/Rock Female Artist
|
|-

American Society of Composers, Authors and Publishers
The American Society of Composers, Authors and Publishers is an American not-for-profit performance-rights organization (PRO) that protects its members' musical copyrights by monitoring public performances of their music, whether via a broadcast or live performance, and compensating them accordingly. Grant has received an award in 1996.

|-
| align="center"| 1996
| align="center"| Amy Grant
| align="center"| Voice of America
|
|-

Saint John's University
The College of Saint Benedict and Saint John's University are partnered liberal arts colleges respectively located in St. Joseph and Collegeville, Minnesota, USA. Grant has received one award.

|-
| rowspan="2" align="center"| 1994
| rowspan="3" align="center"| Amy Grant
| align="center"|Pax Christi Award
|
|-

GMA Dove Awards
The GMA Dove Awards are presented annually by the Gospel Music Association for outstanding achievements in the Christian music industry. According to the awards' official site, Grant has received twenty-two awards, though her official site claims twenty-six awards.

|-
| rowspan="3" align="center"| 1983
| align="center"| Amy Grant
| align="center"| Artist of the Year
|
|-
| rowspan="2" align="center"| Age to Age
| align="center"| Pop/Contemporary Album of the Year
|
|-
| rowspan="2" align="center"| Recorded Music Packaging of the Year
|
|-
| align="center"| 1984
| align="center"| A Christmas Album
|
|-
| align="center"| 1985
| align="center"| Straight Ahead
| align="center"| Pop/Contemporary Album of the Year
|
|-
| rowspan="2" align="center"| 1986
| align="center"| Amy Grant
| align="center"| Artist of the Year
|
|-
| align="center"| Unguarded
| align="center"| Recorded Music Packaging of the Year
|
|-
| align="center"| 1988
| align="center"| "Stay for Awhile"
| align="center"| Short Form Music Video of the Year
|
|-
| rowspan="3" align="center"| 1989
| align="center"| Amy Grant
| align="center"| Artist of the Year
|
|-
| align="center"| Lead Me On
| align="center"| Pop/Contemporary Album of the Year
|
|-
| align="center"| "Lead Me On"
| align="center"| Short Form Music Video of the Year
|
|-
| align="center"| 1990
| align="center"| "'Tis So Sweet to Trust in Jesus"
| align="center"| Country Recorded Song of the Year
|
|-
| rowspan="2" align="center"| 1992
| align="center"| "Place in this World"
| align="center"| Song of the Year
|
|-
| align="center"| Amy Grant
| align="center"| Artist of the Year
|
|-
| align="center"| 1994
| align="center"| Songs from the Loft
| align="center"| Praise and Worship Album of the Year
|
|-
| align="center"| 1996
| align="center"| My Utmost for His Highest
| align="center"| Special Event Album of the Year
|
|-
| align="center"| 1998
| align="center"| Behind the Eyes
| align="center"| Pop/Contemporary Album of the Year
|
|-
| align="center"| 2000
| align="center"| Streams
| align="center"| Special Event Album of the Year
|
|-
| rowspan="2" align="center"| 2003
| align="center"| Legacy... Hymns and Faith
| align="center"| Inspirational Album of the Year
|
|-
| align="center"| "The River's Gonna Keep on Rolling"
| align="center"| Country Recorded Song of the Year
|
|-
| align="center"| 2004
| align="center"| Simple Things
| align="center"| Pop/Contemporary Album of the Year
|
|-
| align="center"| 2006
| align="center"| Rock of Ages... Hymns and Faith
| align="center"| Inspirational Album of the Year
|
|-
| align="center"| 2007
| align="center"| Time Again… Live
| align="center"| Long Form Music Video of the Year
|
|-
| align="center"| 2011
| align="center"| "Better Than A Hallelujah"
| align="center"| Short Form Music Video of the Year
|
|-

Grammy Awards
The Grammy Awards are awarded annually by the National Academy of Recording Arts and Sciences of the United States for outstanding achievements in the music industry. Often considered the highest music honor, the awards were established in 1958. Amy Grant has won six awards of sixteen nominations.

|-
| align="center"|1979 || My Father's Eyes || Best Gospel Performance, Contemporary or Inspirational || 
|-
| align="center"|1980 || Never Alone || Best Gospel Performance, Contemporary or Inspirational || 
|-
| align="center"|1981 || Amy Grant in Concert || Best Gospel Performance, Contemporary or Inspirational || 
|-
| align="center"|1982 || Age to Age || Best Gospel Performance, Contemporary || 
|-
| align="center"|1983 || Ageless Medley || rowspan="3"|Best Gospel Vocal Performance, Female || 
|-
| align="center"|1984 || "Angels" || 
|-
| rowspan="2" align="center"|1985  || Unguarded || 
|-
|"I Could Never Say Goodbye" || Best Gospel Vocal Performance by a Duo or Group, Choir or Chorus || 
|-
| align="center"|1987 || "The Next Time I Fall" || |Best Pop Performance by a Duo or Group with Vocal || 
|-
| align="center"|1988 || Lead Me On || Best Gospel Vocal Performance, Female || 
|-
| align="center"|1989 || "'Tis So Sweet to Trust in Jesus" || Best Gospel Vocal Performance, Female || 
|-
| rowspan="4" align="center"|1992 || Heart in Motion || Album of the Year || 
|-
| rowspan="3"|"Baby Baby" || Song of the Year || 
|-
| Record of the Year || 
|-
| Best Female Pop Vocal Performance || 
|-
| align="center"|1994 || The Creation || Best Spoken Word Album for Children || 
|-
| align="center"|2000 || "When I Look Into Your Heart"  || Best Country Collaboration with Vocals || 
|-
| align="center"|2005 || Rock of Ages... Hymns and Faith || Best Southern, Country or Bluegrass Gospel Album || 
|-
| align="center"|2011 || "Better Than a Hallelujah" || Best Gospel Song || 
|-
| align="center"|2012 || "Threaten Me with Heaven" || Best Country Song || 
|-
|}

MTV Video Music Awards
The MTV Video Music Awards are awarded annually by MTV. Grant has received one nomination.

|-
| rowspan="2" align="center"| 1991
| rowspan="3" align="center"| "Baby Baby"
| align="center"|Best Female Video
|
|-

Nashville Symphony
The Nashville Symphony awarded Grant with Harmony Award in 1994.

|-
| rowspan="2" align="center"| 1994
| rowspan="3" align="center"| Amy Grant
| align="center"|Harmony Award
|
|-

United States Junior Chamber
The United States Junior Chamber is a leadership training and civic organization for people between the ages of 18 and 41. Areas of emphasis are business development, management skills, individual training, community service, and international connections. Grant has received one award.

|-
| rowspan="2" align="center"| 1992
| rowspan="3" align="center"| Amy Grant
| align="center"|Young Tennessean of the Year
|
|-

References

External links
 Official website

Grant, Amy